Lung Ha Wan is a bay at the Clear Water Bay Peninsula in Hong Kong. It is located at the north end of Clear Water Bay Country Park.

The main trail in the country park, Lung Ha Wan Country Trail was named after this bay. The area is also known for having one of the nine rock carvings of Hong Kong listed as declared monuments.

References

Bays of Hong Kong
Clear Water Bay Peninsula